David John Allan (born 16 August 1972), or as he is more commonly known, JD Allan, is a Scottish musician, singer-songwriter, animator, web developer and writer. Allan is the older brother of musician and actor, William Rogue, and a former member of Scottish rock band The Blimp.

References

External links
JD Allan at AllMusic

JD Allan on Twitter
JD Allan’s official site

1972 births
Living people
Scottish songwriters
Scottish writers
Scottish animators
21st-century Scottish male singers
British male songwriters